Glen Tilt (Scottish Gaelic: Gleann Teilt) is a glen in the extreme north of Perthshire, Scotland. Beginning at the confines of Aberdeenshire, it follows a South-westerly direction excepting for the last 4 miles, when it runs due south to Blair Atholl. It is watered throughout by the Tilt, which enters the Garry after a course of 14 miles, and receives on its right the Tarf, which forms some beautiful falls just above the confluence, and on the left the Fender, which has some fine falls also. The attempt of George Murray, 6th Duke of Atholl to close the glen to the public was successfully contested by the Scottish Rights of Way Society in 1847. The massive mountain of Beinn a' Ghlò and its three Munros Càrn nan Gabhar (1129 m), Bràigh Coire Chruinn-bhalgain (1070 m) and Càrn Liath (975) dominate the glen's eastern lower half.

Marble of good quality is occasionally quarried in the glen, and the rock formation has long attracted the attention of geologists. One of the earliest was  James Hutton, who visited the glen in 1785 and found boulders with granite penetrating metamorphic schists in a way which indicated that the granite had been molten at the time. This showed to him that granite formed from cooling of molten rock, contradicting the ideas of Neptunism of that time that theorised that rocks were formed by precipitation out of water. Hutton concluded that the granite must be younger than the schists. This was one of the findings that led him to develop his theory of Plutonism and the concept of an immensely long geologic time scale with "no vestige of a beginning, no prospect of an end." Sir John Clerk of Eldin visited the site and produced geological drawings of the area, immediately upstream of the old Dail-An-Eas Bridge which has since collapsed but the abutments remain as a listed building.

A chronicle written by Robert Lindsay of Pitscottie in the 1570s describes a banquet prepared by the Earl of Atholl for James V to impress a Papal ambassador. This event seems to have taken place in 1532 in a temporary wooden lodge built like a castle in Glen Tilt. The lodging was burnt at the end of the event. Mary, Queen of Scots visited Glen Tilt in August 1564, and wrote a letter from the "Lunkartis in Glentilth" to her ally Colin Campbell of Glenorchy.

References

External links
Walking Scotland - Old Bridge of Tilt - Glen Tilt - Gows Bridge
Pitlochry Walks - GLEN TILT
Image Bank - Glen Tilt valley sides
Tour Glen Tilt, Tour Scotland.

Tilt
Landforms of Aberdeenshire
Valleys of Perth and Kinross